The Essential Iron Maiden is the fourth greatest hits compilation by the British heavy metal band Iron Maiden, released on 12 July 2005. Released exclusively in North America, it is part of Sony Music Entertainment's The Essential series. Contrary to other releases from this series, the track listing is presented in reverse-chronological order (i.e., the latest studio-recorded songs appear first).

It is the second album by the band that does not feature Eddie on its cover, the first being the first edition of Live at Donington.

Track listing

Credits 
 Paul Di'Anno – Vocals (Disc 2-Tracks 10–12)
 Bruce Dickinson – Vocals (Disc 1-Tracks 1–4, 9–13; Disc 2-Tracks 1–9, 13–14)
 Blaze Bayley – Vocals (Disc 1-Tracks 5–8)
 Dave Murray – Guitar (All Tracks)
 Dennis Stratton – Guitar (Disc 2-Track 12)
 Adrian Smith – Guitar (Disc 1-Tracks 1–4,13; Disc 2-1–11, 13–14)
 Janick Gers – Guitar (Disc 1-Tracks 1–12; Disc 2-Track 14)
 Steve Harris – Bass (All Tracks), producer (Disc 1-Tracks 1—9; Disc 2-Track 14)
 Clive Burr – Drums (Disc 2-Tracks 8–12)
 Nicko McBrain – Drums (Disc 1-All Tracks; Disc 2-Tracks 1–7, 13–14)

with

 Martin Birch – Producer
 Simon Fowler – Photography
 Lonn Friend – Liner notes
 Nigel Green – Producer
 Michael Kenney – Keyboards
 Will Malone – Producer
 Dimo Safari – Cover photo
 Kevin Shirley – Producer, engineer, mastering, mixing
 Howie Weinberg – Mastering

References

Iron Maiden compilation albums
Albums produced by Martin Birch
Albums produced by Kevin Shirley
Albums produced by Wil Malone
2005 greatest hits albums
Heavy metal compilation albums